The St. John's water dog, also known as the St. John's dog or the lesser Newfoundland,  is an extinct landrace of domestic dog from Newfoundland. Little is known of the types that went into its genetic makeup, although it was probably a random-bred mix of old English, Irish and Portuguese working dogs. They were favourite dogs of fishermen because they had extraordinary qualities like good temperament and working behaviour. The number of St. John's water dogs started declining by the beginning of the 20th century. By the early 1980s, the landrace was extinct.

During the 19th and early 20th centuries, St. John's water dogs were exported from Newfoundland to England. These dogs were crossbred with other dogs to create the retrievers.  It was the ancestor of the modern retrievers, including the Flat-Coated Retriever, Curly-Coated Retriever, the Chesapeake Bay Retriever, the Golden Retriever, and the Labrador Retriever. The St. John's water dog was also an ancestor to the large and gentle Newfoundland, probably through breeding with Rafeiro do Alentejos brought to the island by the generations of Portuguese fishermen who had been fishing offshore since the 15th century.

Appearance

The St. John's breed were called "water dogs" because of their love for water and their coat, which was water-resistant.  St. John's water dogs were medium-sized, strong, and stocky – more closely resembling modern English Labradors than American Labradors. They had characteristic white patches on the chest, chin, feet, and muzzle. This colouration occasionally manifests in modern Labs as a small white chest patch – known as a "medallion" – or as a few stray white hairs on the feet. The classic tuxedo markings of the St. John's water dog commonly manifest in Labrador Retriever mixes.

Writings as early as the 17th century mention hardy medium-sized black dogs that accompanied Newfoundland fishermen in their boats, and retrieved distant lines or nets of fish, hauling them back to the boat. The dogs were described as having a short thick coat, rudder-like tail, high endurance, and a great love of swimming.

History

Extinction
The St. John's water dog was made extinct in its homeland by a combination of two factors. In an attempt to encourage sheep raising, heavy restrictions and taxes were placed on dog ownership during the 19th century. Also their main overseas destination, the UK, imposed a rigorous long-term quarantine on all imported animals, especially dogs (1885) as part of the eradication of rabies. However, in both Newfoundland and the Maritime provinces, there are still large black mixed-breed dogs with many characteristics of the original St. John's water dog.

The last two known St. John's water dogs were photographed in the early 1980s (in old age) having survived in a "very remote area", but both were male, bringing the era of the St. John's water dog to an end.

In the 1970s, Canadian author Farley Mowat had tried to save them by crossing his St. John's water dog, named "Albert", with a Labrador Retriever. Four puppies resulted, and all had the distinctive white markings of their sire. Two puppies died, the other two were given away. One was given to Canadian prime minister Pierre Trudeau and the other to Soviet Premier Alexei Kosygin. In 1970, Mowat and Albert appeared in an episode of the CBC series Telescope. The episode includes Mowat telling a bedtime story to his dog.

References

Extinct dog breeds of Canada
Dog landraces